Kulich may refer to:

 Kulich, Eastern-Orthodox Easter bread 
 Kulich, Iran, village in Iran
 Kulich (surname)

See also
 Kulič (disambiguation)
 Kulić, surname
 Kulic (surname)